Winnie Chang Shih-ying (born December 2, 1979) is a Taiwanese actress. She began her career on stage in 2002 and became known for her role in the 2010 film Seven Days in Heaven. In 2019, she starred in the film The Teacher and 
won the Golden Horse Award for Best Supporting Actress.

Selected filmography

Film

Television series

Awards and nominations

References

External links 
 
 

1979 births
Living people
21st-century Taiwanese actresses
Taiwanese film actresses
Taiwanese television actresses
Taipei National University of the Arts alumni
Taiwanese stage actresses